Since the Victorian Football League (VFL), which is now known as the Australian Football League (AFL), was formed in 1897, there have been 178 known players of Indigenous Australian heritage that have played in a senior VFL/AFL match, and 11 known players of Indigenous descent have played in the AFL Women's since the inaugural season in 2017. A senior VFL/AFL or AFL Women's match is an Australian rules football match between two clubs that are, or have been in the past, members of the VFL/AFL or of the AFL Women's. A senior VFL/AFL or AFL Women's match is played under the laws of Australian football, and includes regular season matches, as well as finals series matches. It does not include pre-season matches, interstate matches or international rules football matches. The list is arranged in alphabetical order by surname.

The first recognised Indigenous Australian player to play in a senior VFL/AFL match was Joe Johnson who played 55 games for Fitzroy from 1904 to 1906, and was a member of Fitzroy's dual premiership-winning sides of 1904 and 1905. Gavin Wanganeen (Essendon and Port Adelaide) was the first Indigenous Australian player to play 300 games, and Shaun Burgoyne is the current record-holder of most games played by an Indigenous player with 407 games for Port Adelaide and Hawthorn from 2002 onwards.

There were a record number of Indigenous players on AFL lists during the 2009 AFL season with 82 senior and rookie-listed players listed with AFL clubs. This figure surpassed the previous record of 73 players set in the 2008 season.

The Fremantle Football Club initially under inaugural coach Gerard Neesham, have been big supporters of indigenous players. They have had 34 indigenous players represent their club in AFL matches, with 11 of the 2018 list of indigenous representation. They set records for the most number of indigenous players in AFL/VFL matches in 2003, with seven players, in an 83 point win over the Western Bulldogs and then again in Indigenous Round (Round 10) 2017 with eight players.

Players
 Players are listed in alphabetical order, and statistics are for VFL/AFL or AFL Women's regular season and finals series matches only. "Career span" years are from the season of the player's debut in the VFL/AFL or AFL Women's to the year in which they played their final game in the VFL/AFL or AFL Women's and have since been removed from the playing list. Currently listed players are shaded in green and their career span is listed as "(year of debut)–present". Statistics are correct to the end of the 2011 AFL season and 2018 AFL Women's season.

 Legend
Players named in the Indigenous Team of the Century are indicated by a # next to their name.

VFL/AFL

AFL Women's

See also

List of NRL players of Indigenous Australian descent

References

Indigenous Australian players
Women football